Dimeh Sorkh (also Romanized as Dīmeh Sorkh) is a village in Zakharuiyeh Rural District, Efzar District, Qir and Karzin County, Fars Province, Iran. At the 2006 census, its population was 134, in 24 families.

References 

Populated places in Qir and Karzin County